George Thomas Saxbee (5 August 1881 – 23 January 1936) was an Australian rules footballer who played with Geelong in the Victorian Football League (VFL).

Notes

External links 

1881 births
1936 deaths
Australian rules footballers from Victoria (Australia)
Geelong Football Club players
East Geelong Football Club players